The Nashville Sessions may refer to:

Music
Chicago XXXV: The Nashville Sessions by the band Chicago  2013
The Nashville Sessions (Dean Martin album)
The Nashville Session, album by The New Mastersounds 2016
The Nashville Session II, album by The New Mastersounds 2018
The Nashville Sessions (Townes Van Zandt album), album by Townes Van Zandt 1993
The Nashville Sessions, album by Leftover Salmon 1999
The Nashville Sessions, album by Big Country
The Nashville Sessions, UK version of Buddy Holly album That'll Be the Day (album)
The Nashville Sessions, highlights album from The Civil War (musical)
Down the Old Plank Road: The Nashville Sessions 2002 album by The Chieftains
Down the Old Plank Road: The Nashville Sessions [DVD] The Chieftains 2003
Further Down the Old Plank Road: The Nashville Sessions The Chieftains 2003
I Sing All Kinds: The Nashville 1971 Sessions Elvis Presley 2007
Next Hex: The Nashville Sessions '74,  Dr. John 1999
Blue Lady: Nashville Sessions, album by Petula Clark 1995